Bongeziwe Mabandla is a South African musician based in Johannesburg, predominantly playing folk music with lyrics in isiXhosa, accompanied by a guitar.

Early life
Mabandla grew up in the rural Eastern Cape, in a small town called Tsolo. He grew up singing in church and music was a part of his home and school life. He moved to Johannesburg to continue his studies at AFDA, The School for the Creative Economy. Here he explored an expression of musical storytelling.

Career
Recorded in 2012, Mabandla's debut album, Umlilo, caught the attention of Radio France Internationale Discoveries Awards, where he was named one of the Top 10 finalists in 2011. His second album, Mangaliso, was released in 2017 and expanded from the traditional Afro-Folk sound that Mabandla had become known for. With far more significant reach, the album earned Mabandla a SAMA (South African Music Awards) nomination for 2018 Best Alternative Album. The music video for the single "Bawo Bam" featured Spoek Mathambo, and received awards at the 2018 Capital City Black Film Awards and at the 2019 Jozi Film Fest. Since the release of these two albums, Mabandla has performed on stages and at festivals across the world. This includes Reeperbahn Festival, WOMEX and Lake of Stars Festival Malawi.

His latest studio album, iiMini, was released on 27 March 2020.

Discography 

 Umlilo (2012)
 Mangaliso (2017)
 iiMini (2020)

Singles

Yise (feat. Synapson) 

In the song, Mabandla paints a picture of the hardships of growing up without his father and how it has made him a stronger person.

Tours

Mangaliso Tour (2018)

iiMini Tour (2020) 
Due to the COVID-19 pandemic, this tour was postponed indefinitely.

References

Living people
People from the Eastern Cape
South African singer-songwriters
Xhosa-language singers
Year of birth missing (living people)